The 24th Central American and Caribbean Championships in Athletics were held at the Pista de Atletismo "Ernesto Canto" del Complejo Olímpico Bicentenario in Morelia, Michoacán, Mexico, between July 5–7, 2013.
 
A total of 44 events were contested, 22 by men and 22 by women.

A detailed analysis of the championships was published by Javier Clavelo Robinson.

Records
Two new Central American and Caribbean Championships records and a couple of other (mainly national) records were set.

Medal summary

The results were published.

Men

Women

†: In women's 10000 m, some athletes were invited to start out of competition.

Medal table

Participation
The published competition results  report the participation of about 338 athletes from 28 countries. Colombia, Panama and Suriname sent their athletes to the South American Championships held in Cartagena de Indias, Colombia at the same weekend. Aruba, Belize and Nicaragua did not participate.

 (3)
 (3)
 (25)
 (12)
 (7)
 (6)
 (5)
 (10)
 (9)
 (6)
 (21)
 (4)
 (14)
 (3)
 Haiti (7)
 (3)
 (39)
 (82)
 (2)
 (22)
 (8)
 (3)
 (3)
 (6)
 (32)
 (1)
 (1)
 (1)

References

Central American and Caribbean Championships in Athletics
International athletics competitions hosted by Mexico
Central American and Caribbean Age Group Championships in Athletics
Central American and Caribbean Age Group Championships in Athletics
Athletic 
Athletic